Filimonas aquilariae is a Gram-negative, aerobic and rod-shaped bacterium from the genus of Filimonas which has been isolated from agarwood chips.

References

External links
Type strain of Filimonas aquilariae at BacDive -  the Bacterial Diversity Metadatabase

Chitinophagia
Bacteria described in 2017